Friedenthal may refer to:

Felix Pino von Friedenthal (1825–1906), Austrian civil servant and politician
Karl Rudolf Friedenthal (1827–1890), Prussian statesman
Markus Bär Friedenthal (1780/1–1859), Jewish merchant, landowner, writer
Meelis Friedenthal (born 1973), Estonian writer

See also
(Anglicized) Lloyd Fredendall (1883-1963), American general

Surnames